Gambierdiscus caribaeus is a species of toxic dinoflagellate, which among others causes ciguatera fish poisoning. It is photosynthetic and epibenthic.

References

Further reading
Jeong, Hae Jin, et al. "First report of the epiphytic dinoflagellate Gambierdiscus caribaeus in the temperate waters off Jeju Island, Korea: Morphology and molecular characterization." Journal of Eukaryotic Microbiology 59.6 (2012): 637-650.
Litaker, R. Wayne, et al. "Global distribution of ciguatera causing dinoflagellates in the genus Gambierdiscus." Toxicon 56.5 (2010): 711-730.

External links
AlgaeBase

Gonyaulacales
Protists described in 2009